48th National Board of Review Awards
December 22, 1976

Best Picture: 
 All the President's Men 
The 48th National Board of Review Awards were announced on December 22, 1976.

Top Ten Films 
All the President's Men
Network
Rocky
The Last Tycoon
The Seven-Per-Cent Solution
The Front
The Shootist
Family Plot
Silent Movie
Obsession

Top Foreign Films 
The Marquise of O
Face to Face
Small Change
Cousin, cousine
The Clockmaker

Winners 
Best Film:
All the President's Men
Best Foreign Film:
Face to Face
Best Actor:
David Carradine - Bound for Glory
Best Actress:
Liv Ullmann - Face to Face
Best Supporting Actor:
Jason Robards - All the President's Men
Best Supporting Actress:
Talia Shire - Rocky
Best Director:
Alan J. Pakula - All the President's Men

External links 
National Board of Review of Motion Pictures :: Awards for 1976

1976
1976 film awards
1976 in American cinema